

Owners
Ban Johnson & Fred Postal
Thomas C. Noyes
Clark Griffith
Calvin Griffith
Carl Pohlad
Jim Pohlad

General Managers
Calvin Griffith
Howard Fox
Andy MacPhail (Won WS twice in 1987 and 1991)
Terry Ryan (1995-2007, again from 2012)
Bill Smith (2008-2011)
Terry Ryan (after first stint 1995-2007, 2012 - 2016)
Rob Antony (interim 2016)
Thad Levine (2016-present)

Presidents
Calvin Griffith
Howard Fox
Jerry Bell
Dave St. Peter
Derek Falvey - President of Baseball Operations

Other executives
Ossie Bluege
George Brophy
Derek Falvey
Bob Gebhard
Joe Haynes
Wayne Krivsky
Kevin Malone
Jim Rantz

External links
Baseball America: Executive Database

 
 
Minnesota
Owners and executives